Milesia bella is a species of hoverfly in the family Syrphidae.

Distribution
United States, Mexico.

References

Insects described in 1897
Eristalinae
Diptera of North America

Hoverflies of North America
Taxa named by Charles Henry Tyler Townsend